Big break is a term regarding a person's professional profile becoming prominent enough for others to take notice. The term may also refer to:
Big Break, a British snooker television game show
 Big Break (American TV series), American talent competition TV show
My Big Break, a 2009 documentary film
The Big Break, a competitive golf reality television series
Your Big Break, an American singing TV talent show
 Big Break Regional Shoreline, Contra Costa County, California, USA
 Justin Payne, nicknamed Big Break, Toronto vigilante; see Creep Catchers

See also

 Breakthrough role, a similar and related term in the entertainment industry
 Break (disambiguation)
 Breakout (disambiguation)
 Big (disambiguation)
 BidaMan: The Big Break, Philippine TV show
 Big School-Break, Soviet TV miniseries